Henri Darricau (born 30 October 1955) is a Lebanese fencer. He competed in the individual and team foil events at the 1984 Summer Olympics. He has lived in Denver, Colorado since 1979, and served as the head coach for the University of Colorado Fencing Club from 1983-1992.

References

External links
 

1955 births
Living people
Lebanese male foil fencers
Olympic fencers of Lebanon
Fencers at the 1984 Summer Olympics